Dahi puri is an Indian snack food which is especially popular in the state of Maharashtra. The dish is a type of chaat and originates from the city of Mumbai. It is served with mini-puri shells (golgappa), which are also used for the dish pani puri.  Dahi puri and pani puri chaats are often sold from the same vendor.

Preparation
The round, hard, puffy puri shell is first broken on top and partially filled with the main stuffing of mashed potatoes or chickpeas. A small amount of haldi powder or chilli powder, or both, may be added for taste, as well as a pinch of salt. Sweet tamarind chutney and spicy green chutney are then poured into the shell, on top of the stuffing. Finally, sweetened beaten yoghurt is generously poured over the shell, and the finished product is garnished with sprinklings of crushed sev, moong dal, pomegranate and finely chopped coriander leaves.

Dahi puri typically comes as 5 or 6 dahi puris per plate. While pani puri is typically served one piece at a time, a plate of many dahi puri is often served together. Each dahi puri is intended to be eaten whole, like pani puri, so that the spectrum of flavors and textures within may all be tasted together.

See also

 Bhelpuri
 Panipuri
 Papri chaat
 Ragda pattice
 Sevpuri

References

Indian snack foods
Pakistani snack foods
Bangladeshi cuisine
Street food
Indian fast food
Culture of Mumbai
Yogurt-based dishes